Brian Whitehouse (8 September 1935 – 16 January 2017) was an English professional footballer who played as a forward for West Bromwich Albion, Norwich City, Wrexham, Crystal Palace, Charlton and Leyton Orient. He was top scorer for Palace in the 1965–1966 season with seven goals. After his retirement from playing in 1968, he undertook various coaching and scouting positions, and was briefly caretaker manager at West Bromwich Albion in 1975; he died in 2017, aged 81.
Whitehouse's debut came on 14 April 1956 at Portsmouth's Fratton Park as injury to Johnny Nicholls gave manager Vic Buckingham a chance to assess him across the final three games of the season.

References

External links
 

1935 births
2017 deaths
Sportspeople from West Bromwich
English footballers
West Bromwich Albion F.C. players
Norwich City F.C. players
Wrexham A.F.C. players
Crystal Palace F.C. players
Charlton Athletic F.C. players
Leyton Orient F.C. players
Tamworth F.C. players
English football managers
West Bromwich Albion F.C. managers
Manchester United F.C. non-playing staff
English Football League players
Association football forwards